Utricularia multifida, commonly called pink petticoat or fairy aprons, is a terrestrial carnivorous plant that belongs to the bladderwort genus, Utricularia, of family Lentibulariaceae. It is endemic to the south west corner of Western Australia. It was once placed in a separate genus as Polypompholyx multifida.

See also 
 List of Utricularia species

References 

Carnivorous plants of Australia
Eudicots of Western Australia
Lamiales of Australia
multifida